Do is the fifth studio album by American comedy metal band Psychostick. It is the first studio album since 2003 – when they released We Couldn't Think of a Title – that was self-released by the band after they parted ways with the label Rock Ridge. The album is dedicated to the memory of Urizen bassist Rustin Luther, who died in 2017 of a brain tumor. He is featured in "Introvert Party Time."

The album debuted at number one on the Billboard Comedy Albums chart.

Background 
The album was the second to be recorded in the band's own studio, after fans funded for the studio while preparing for the previous album, IV: Revenge of the Vengeance. The band announced via Twitch on July 25, 2018, the name of the title, and released the album on their website during the live stream. During the live stream they revealed they worked on the album over four years. The album was released on streaming platforms on July 27, 2018.

Songs 
"Adulting" was released on YouTube on October 30, 2017. "From the Heart (I Hate You)" was released on YouTube on March 8, 2018.

On the Twitch stream on July 25, 2018, the music video for "Do" was released, as well as uploaded on to YouTube. During the Twitch stream Psychostick also played "Tuesday", "Socks and Sandals", "Introvert Party Time", "Stream Stutter", "Rent in Peace", "Uncle Material", "Gurrrrrr", "You Can (Maybe) Do It", "Keys" and "Moving Day". "Do" and "You Can (Maybe) Do It" were released on YouTube shortly after.

Track listing 
All music written by Joshua Key except where noted.

Personnel 
 Joshua "The J" Key — guitars, cupcakeist
 Robert "Rawrb" Kersey — vocals, derptroller
 Alex "Shitbag" Dontre — drums, pelican
 Matty J. "Moose" Rzemyk  — bass, antlers, merch-monger
 Patrick "Murph" Murphy  — videographist, pork specialist

Additional personnel 
 Lynzi Hayes, Kryssie Ridolfi, Rob Whishenhunt – guest vocals on "We Are A Band"
 Sheena Perez – guest vocals on "Adulting"
 Rustin Luther, Anthony Sardinha, Patrick Murphy, Magda "Merchqueen" Ksaizak – guest starring on "Introvert Party Time"
 Kryssie Ridolfi, Angela Knight, Nick "Gino" Ferrari – guest vocals on "Socks & Sandals"

References 

2018 albums
Psychostick albums